Spiroterma is a genus of moth in the family Cosmopterigidae. It contains only one species, Spiroterma caranaea, which is found in Sri Lanka.

References

External links
Natural History Museum Lepidoptera genus database

Cosmopterigidae